Suzanne Doyle-Morris is an Australian writer and researcher based in Edinburgh, Scotland.

Biography
Doyle-Morris earned a doctorate in 2003 from Cambridge University in for her work on the experiences of women working in a male-dominated environment.

Dr. Doyle-Morris set up InclusIQ in 2012 as an inclusion consultancy, after 10 years initially consulting, speaking and executive coaching around these topics   InclusIQ. Her main clients are in the STEM, Finance and the Legal sector.

Since 2009, she has written three books, Beyond the Boy's Club: Strategies for achieving career success as a woman working in a male dominated field and in 2011 'Female Breadwinners: how they make relationships work and why they are the future of the modern workplace''. In this second book, she focused on the increasingly common experiences of professional women earning more than their romantic partners. Her third book, 'The Con Job: Getting Ahead for Competence in a World Obsessed with Confidence' focuses on a key challenge she sees for the workplaces in which consults; the risk of rewarding bravado and self-promotion over delivery and evidence-based outcomes.

In 2022, she was awarded the 'Master Certified Coach' credential - the highest peer-reviewed award given by the International Coach Federation, based on her 15 years of executive coaching with corporates. She is also an Ambassador for Women's Enterprise Scotland and a Fellow of the Saltire Foundation. She can be reached via her website or via SpeakerHub.

Awards and recognition
On 1 November 2017, Doyle-Morris was listed as one of BBC's 100 Women as part of the glass ceiling team.

References

Date of birth missing (living people)
Living people
People from Alice Springs
21st-century Australian women writers
Alumni of the University of Cambridge
BBC 100 Women
Year of birth missing (living people)